A corn dog (also spelled corndog) is a sausage (usually a wiener) on a stick that has been coated in a thick layer of cornmeal batter and deep fried. It originated in the United States and is commonly found in American cuisine.

History

Newly arrived German immigrants in Texas, who were sausage-makers finding resistance to the sausages they used to make, have been credited with introducing the corn dog to the United States, though the serving stick came later.  A US patent filed in 1927, granted in 1929, for a Combined Dipping, Cooking, and Article Holding Apparatus, describes corn dogs, among other fried food impaled on a stick; it reads in part:

A "Krusty Korn Dog" baker machine appeared in the 1926 Albert Pick-Barth wholesale catalog of hotel and restaurant supplies. The 'korn dogs' were baked in a corn batter and resembled ears of corn when cooked.

A number of current corn dog vendors claim responsibility for the invention and/or popularization of the corn dog. Carl and Neil Fletcher lay such a claim, having introduced their "Corny Dogs" at the State Fair of Texas sometime between 1938 and 1942.  Pronto Pup of Rockaway Beach, Oregon, claims to have invented the corn dog in 1939.  Cozy Dog Drive-in, in Springfield, Illinois, claims to have been the first to serve corn dogs on sticks, on June 16, 1946. Also in 1946, Dave Barham opened the first location of Hot Dog on a Stick at Muscle Beach in Santa Monica, California.

Preparation
Corn dogs are often served as street food or as fast food. For the best and freshest preparation, some vendors or restaurateurs dip and fry their corn dogs just before serving. Some corn dog purveyors sell pre-made frozen corn dogs, which are then thawed and fried again, or browned in an oven.

Corn dogs can also be found at almost any supermarket and convenience store store in North America as frozen foods as well as served hot and ready to eat.  Pre-made frozen corn dogs can also be heated in a microwave oven, but the cornbread coating will lack texture.

Variations
One cheesy variation is prepared either with melted cheese between the hot dog and the breading or by using a cheese-filled hot dog.

Another version is the "cornbrat" (or "corn brat"), which is a corn dog made with bratwurst instead of a wiener or hot dog. 

Small corn dogs, known as "corn puppies", "mini corn dogs", or "corn dog nuggets", are a variation served in some restaurants, generally on the children's menu or at fast food establishments. A serving includes multiple pieces, usually 10. In contrast to their larger counterparts, corn puppies are normally served stickless as finger food.

A breakfast version of the corn dog features a breakfast sausage in place of the hot dog, and pancake batter in place of the cornmeal. This variation is commonly called a "pancake on a stick". It was formerly served by the drive-in restaurant Sonic, but it is now made by companies such as Jimmy Dean.

Both vegetarian corn dogs and corn dog nuggets are made as meatless alternatives by many of the same companies that produce vegetarian hot dogs.

By country

Argentina 

In Argentina, a panchuker (or panchuque, pancho chino) is a hot snack that can be bought near some train stations and in some places of heavy pedestrian transit. They are more popular in the inner country cities. A panchuker consists of a sausage covered with a waffle-like pastry, and has a stick in it (like a corn dog) so that it can be easily consumed. Some versions contain cheese, and sauces may be served to accompany them. Some variations may be found in Uruguay and other South American countries. Generally, panchukers are offered as a low-price fast food and can only be seen at certain provinces of the inner country—like La Plata, Belgrano, Villa Albertina, and Cipoletti—and, in Buenos Aires, they can be found in Barrio Chino. They are particularly popular in the province of Tucumán.

Australia 
In Australia, a hot dog sausage on a stick, deep-fried in batter, is known as a Dagwood Dog, Pluto Pup, or Dippy Dog, depending on region.  Variants use wheat-based or corn-based batters. These are not to be confused with the Australian battered sav, a saveloy deep fried in a wheat flour-based batter, as used for fish and chips, which generally does not contain cornmeal.

Canada 
In Quebec and Ontario, a battered hot dog on a stick is called a "pogo" and is traditionally eaten with ordinary yellow mustard, sometimes referred to as "ballpark mustard". The rest of Canada refers to them by the non-trademarked term "corn dog" It is named after the trademarked name of a Conagra inc. frozen product available in all of the country since the 1960s but whose main market is the province of Quebec.

Japan 
In Japan, the equivalent food is usually called an  based on the idea of where the food is believed to originate. It is also called "French Dog" in certain parts of Japan including Hokkaido.

South Africa 
In South Africa, a corn dog is a popular cafe/fair food. A corn dog is usually called "Yankee" in the Afrikaans language. It is usually served with a sweet pink sauce made from a mixture of mayonnaise, tomato sauce and condensed milk.

South Korea 
In South Korea, a corn dog is one of the most popular street foods.  A corn dog is usually called "hot dog" in the Korean language (핫도그), creating confusion with a genuine hot dog.  A French fry–encrusted corn dog, or "Kogo," has especially attracted the attention of Western visitors, including vegans (using vegan hot dogs).

New Zealand 
A New Zealand Hot Dog is invariably a deep-fried battered saveloy on a stick that is dipped in tomato ketchup. The saveloy is thicker than a frankfurter, resulting in a thinner batter layer than American Corndogs. The batter can be cornmeal based or corn flour based. The distinction is not important. The sausage in a bun that is called a hot dog in other countries is known as an "American Hot Dog" and is usually available at the same locations. If a further descriptor is needed to avoid confusion between the two, the New Zealand standard hot dog can be described as a hot dog on a stick.

Annual celebration
National Corndog Day is a celebration of the corn dog, tater tots, and American beer that occurs on the first Saturday of March Madness (NCAA Men's Division I Basketball Championship) of every year.

Gallery

See also

 Bagel dog
 Battered sausage
 Hot dog variations
 Hushpuppy
 Pepperoni roll
 Pigs in a blanket
 Pronto Pup
 Sausage roll
 Saveloy
 Toad in the hole

References

Hot dogs
Deep fried foods
Skewered foods
Maize dishes
Cuisine of the Southern United States
Frozen food
State fairs
American meat dishes